Robert Earl Davis Jr. (July 20, 1971 – November 16, 2000), better known by his stage name DJ Screw, was an American hip hop DJ based in Houston, Texas, and best known as the creator of the chopped and screwed DJ technique. He was a central and influential figure in the Houston hip hop community and was the leader of Houston's Screwed Up Click.

Davis released over 350 mixtapes and was recognized as an innovator mostly on a regional level until his death of codeine overdose in 2000. His legacy was discovered by a wider audience around 2005, and has gone on to influence a wide variety of artists.

Early life
Robert Earl Davis, Jr. was born in Smithville, Texas. His father, Robert Earl Davis Sr., was a long-haul truck driver based in Houston. His mother Ida May Deary (who had a young daughter from a previous marriage), came to the area to be with her mother when her son was born in 1971. She returned to Houston, but the marriage was floundering; soon it would be over, and she and her kids moved to Los Angeles for a couple of years, then back to Houston, and returned to Smithville in 1980 when Davis was age nine.

When young, DJ Screw had aspirations of being a truck driver like his father, but seeing the 1984 hit break dancing movie Breakin' and discovering his mother's turntable attracted him to music. His admiration of classical music drove him to resume piano lessons. After seven years of practice, he was able to play works like Chopin's Etude in C major by ear. His musical interest shifted as he took his mother's B.B. King and Johnnie Taylor records and scratched them on the turntable the way DJs did, slowing the spinning disc and then allowing it to speed back up, playing with sound.

Davis began buying records of his own and would spin with his friend Trey Adkins, who would rhyme. "Screw had a jam box and he hooked up two turntables to it and made a fader out of the radio tuner so he could deejay." Adkins said if Robert Earl didn't like a record, he would deface it with a screw. One day Adkins asked him, "Who do you think you are, DJ Screw?" Robert Earl liked the sound of that and, in turn, gave his long-time friend a new name: Shorty Mac.

Career

Davis began DJing at age 12 in 1983, and started his trademark slowed-down mixes in 1990, the style became his main focus in late 1991 – early 1992. The mixes began as special compilations requested by friends and those in the know. He soon made them available for sale when his close friend Toe offered to buy a mix from him for ten dollars. At that point, customers had increasingly begun requesting his more well-known mixes instead of personalized lists. During the early 1990s, he invited some of the Houston MCs from the city's south side to rhyme on those mixes. This coalition of emcees eventually became the fathers of the Screwed Up Click. Many members of the Screwed Up Click, or S.U.C., are considered key figures in the canon of Houston hip hop. The original lineup included Big Hawk, Big Moe, E.S.G., and Fat Pat, among others. The crew later gained then upcoming artists such as, Z-Ro, Trae tha Truth as well as Lil Flip. His career began to advance once he met Russell Washington of BigTyme Recordz and signed to the label.

Davis later moved to a house in the 7600 block of Greenstone Street near Gulfgate Mall. Fans, some driving from far away areas such as Dallas and Waco, lined up at his door to obtain his recordings. He started his own business and opened a shop up on 7717 Cullen Blvd in Houston, TX, called Screwed Up Records and Tapes. It has been shown in numerous music videos and documentaries as well as independent films. In the early 2010s, this location closed. It has since been relocated to 3538 West Fuqua, Houston, TX. Fans may also purchase merchandise, including mixtapes, on the S.U.C. website. There are now several Screwed Up Records and Tapes spread out through Texas, including one in Beaumont and in Austin.

Death and legacy
On November 16, 2000, Davis was found dead inside of his Houston recording studio in the 8100 block of Commerce Park Drive. Fans speculated about the true cause of his death. When the coroner reports were released, they confirmed that he died of a codeine overdose in addition to mixed drug intoxication. The codeine came from a prescription-strength cough syrup that he would mix with soda to make lean ("purple drank"). In addition to codeine, Valium and PCP were found in his blood. His funeral took place at Mount Pilgrim Baptist Church in his hometown of Smithville, Texas.

DJ Screw has been a considerable influence in the Houston scene and beyond, "helping to cement his legacy as an underappreciated avant-gardist, creator of a sui generis sound that’s still growing and mutating." Texas governor Rick Perry honored him by making him an official Texas Music Pioneer. The Houston Press named the 1995 album 3 'n the Mornin' (Part Two) as no. 13 on its list of the 25 best Houston rap albums of all time, crediting the release for the way it helped shape Houston's hip-hop culture.  When the Houston hip-hop scene became nationally prominent in 2004, many of the biggest acts could be traced to DJ Screw's crew, the Screwed Up Click.  Many artists outside of Houston rap have been influenced by Screw's work, including experimental electronic artists such as Oneohtrix Point Never, Balam Acab, How to Dress Well, and Rabit.

The genre shown by DJ Screw has since evolved into a Houston-based subculture that is associated with the recreational consumption of codeine, opulent jewelry and elaborate vintage vehicles. Screw has also left behind a cult following of listeners who self-identify as "screwheads". A music festival and car show in honor of DJ Screw was set up in 2006. The inaugural DJ Screwfest featured 200 vehicles and a set list featuring notable Houston hip-hop acts like Trae and Chingo Bling. The first festival took place at the Pasadena County Fairgrounds. The 2007 documentary film Screwed In Houston, produced by VBS/Vice Magazine, details the history of the Houston hip hop scene and the influence of the chopped and screwed sub-culture on Houston hip hop. The 5-part series devotes one full episode to DJ Screw and includes video footage of him days before his death. The University of Houston Libraries Houston Hip Hop Research Collection  includes the DJ Screw Papers  including approximately 1500 vinyl records owned by DJ Screw, original DJ Screw recordings, photographs, handwritten track lists, and more. Some of these materials have been digitized. In July 2019, University of Texas Press announced that Houston Rap Tapes author Lance Scott Walker was writing a book about DJ Screw to be published in spring 2022. In January 2020, the biopic All Screwed Up was revealed, detailing the life and events that DJ Screw went through. In December 2020, Sony announced that the film is in development, with Isaac Yowman directing. No date for release has been announced.

Discography

Albums released while living

Posthumously released albums

Nationally distributed biopic TV series

Nationally distributed documentary films

Official Screwtape mixtape series
The "Screwtapes" were mixtapes that DJ Screw made himself and mainly sold from his house or when traveling to do shows.
Many of his friends freestyled and spoke over the instrumentals and songs.

The mixtapes were re-released after his death in 2000 and given "Diary of the Originator: Chapter" titles.
Despite this, they were not re-released chronologically. The works date between 1993 and 2000.
New chapters continued to be released.

Chapter 001:	Done Deal
Chapter 002:	Tales From Tha 4
Chapter 003:	Duck Sick
Chapter 004:	Choppin’ Game Wit Toe
Chapter 005:	Still A G At 27
Chapter 006:	Down South Hustlers
Chapter 007:	Ballin’ In Da Mall
Chapter 008:	Let’s Call Up On Drank
Chapter 009:	Makin’ Cash Forever
Chapter 010:	Southside Still Holdin
Chapter 011:   Headed 2 Da Classic
Chapter 012:   June 27th
Chapter 013:	Leanin On A Switch
Chapter 014:	Sippin’ Codeine
Chapter 015:	The Next Episode
Chapter 016:	Late Night Fuckin’ Yo Bitch
Chapter 017:	Show Up And Pour Up
Chapter 018:	Killuminati
Chapter 019:	‘N 2 Deep
Chapter 020:	Crumbs To Bricks
Chapter 021:	The World Is Mine
Chapter 022:	P’s And Q’s
Chapter 023:	Dancing Candy
Chapter 024:	9 Months Later
Chapter 025:	Unpredictable
Chapter 026:	Blowin’ Big Behind Tint
Chapter 027:	Plots And Schemes
Chapter 028:	Worldwide Southside
Chapter 029:	Saturday Nite Live
Chapter 030:	G Love
Chapter 031:	2000 Tears
Chapter 032:	G-Code
Chapter 033:	G’d Up Shit
Chapter 034:	It’s A Dirty World
Chapter 035:	Charge It To The Game
Chapter 036:	Who Next With Plex
Chapter 037:	10201
Chapter 038:	Headed 2 Da League
Chapter 039:	One Life To Live
Chapter 040:	Yellowstone vs. The Nation
Chapter 041:	Ghetto Fabulous
Chapter 042:	Popped Up Smoked Up
Chapter 043:	Independence Day
Chapter 044:	Eyes On The Prize
Chapter 045:	100% Business
Chapter 046:	Syrup and Soda
Chapter 047:	Pussy, Weed And Alcohol
Chapter 048:	Gallon 1
Chapter 049:	Codeine Fiend
Chapter 050:	Money Over Bitches
Chapter 051:	9 Fo Shit
Chapter 052:	Only Rollin’ Red
Chapter 053:	Y 2 Grey
Chapter 054:	No Haters Allowed
Chapter 055:	Back On The Streets
Chapter 056:	Blue Ova Grey
Chapter 057:	Wineberry Over Gold
Chapter 058:	You Don’t Work You Don’t Eat
Chapter 059:	Southside Most Wanted
Chapter 060:	All Day In The Trey
Chapter 061:	Niggas Can’t See Me
Chapter 062:	Dead End Hustler For Life
Chapter 063:	Mourn U Till I Join You
Chapter 064:	Locked N Da Game
Chapter 065:	Road To Riches
Chapter 066:	Layed Back Rollin
Chapter 067:	Back In Tha Deck
Chapter 068:	Tre World
Chapter 069:	Southside Riders
Chapter 070:	Endonesia
Chapter 071:	The Final Chapter
Chapter 072:	Off The Head
Chapter 073:	Don’t Make Dollars Don’t Make Sense
Chapter 074:	Mash For My Dream
Chapter 075:	Ridin’ High
Chapter 076:	Black Hearted
Chapter 077:	Only The Real
Chapter 078:	Nobody Does It Better
Chapter 079:	Ain’t Nuthin’ Better
Chapter 080:	Hold Ya Head
Chapter 081:	Screwed Up Texas
Chapter 082:	98 Live
Chapter 083:	Ball 2 U Fall
Chapter 084:	Str8 Puttin’ It Down
Chapter 085:	Riches Over Bitches
Chapter 086:	Gees Nite Out
Chapter 087:	Shinnin’ Like The Sun
Chapter 088:	Blasphemy
Chapter 089:	Outlaws
Chapter 090:	4th Of July
Chapter 091:	Take It How You Wanna
Chapter 092:	Back N Yo Ear
Chapter 093:	Da Reunion
Chapter 094:	Still Hoopin’
Chapter 095:	Sittin’ On Top Of The World
Chapter 096:	Can’t Hold Ya Hand
Chapter 097:	Players Choppin Game
Chapter 098:	Four Corners Of The World
Chapter 099:	Shot Callin’
Chapter 100:	Platinum Shit
Chapter 101:	Graduation 99
Chapter 102:	3 Years Later
Chapter 103:	Popped Up Sittin Low
Chapter 104:	Sittin’ Sideways
Chapter 105:	Everyday Allday
Chapter 106:	On A Pint
Chapter 107:	It’s All Good
Chapter 108:	3 ‘N Da Mornin’
Chapter 109:	Einstein
Chapter 110:	Feel My Pain
Chapter 111:	Shit Don’t Stop
Chapter 112:	Jammin’ Screw
Chapter 113:	Barre
Chapter 114:	Bow Down
Chapter 115:	Down And Out
Chapter 116:	Straight From The Heart
Chapter 117:	Return Of The Red
Chapter 118:	Laftex
Chapter 119:	No Drank
Chapter 120:	10 Deep
Chapter 121:	Another Day Another Dollar
Chapter 122:	Facin’ Time
Chapter 123:	Snitches
Chapter 124:	Hurricane Duck
Chapter 125:	Ooh Wee Man
Chapter 126:   If The Price Is Right
Chapter 127:	Southside Holdin’
Chapter 128:	It’s Gonna Get Better
Chapter 129:	In Yo Face
Chapter 130:	Back 2 The Lab
Chapter 131:	Syrup Sippers
Chapter 132:	Can’t Fade It
Chapter 133:	Money By The Ton
Chapter 134:	Hard Times
Chapter 135:	Steady Dippin’
Chapter 136:	Da Funk Is On Your Mind
Chapter 137:	Blue 22
Chapter 138:	Are U Still Down
Chapter 139:	2 Liters
Chapter 140:	Symptoms Of A Thug
Chapter 141:	Another Platinum Hit
Chapter 142:	All Work No Play
Chapter 143:	Million Dollar Boys
Chapter 144:	Heavy ‘N Tha Game
Chapter 145:	S.U.C. For Life
Chapter 146:	Only Time Will Tell
Chapter 147:	Niggas & Flys
Chapter 148:	Do You Feel Me
Chapter 149:	Beatin Up Da Block
Chapter 150:	Mind On My Money
Chapter 151:	Mo Money
Chapter 152:	Pullin’ On Yo Curve
Chapter 153:	Drankin’ On A Gallon
Chapter 154:	Pop Trunk
Chapter 155:	No Love
Chapter 156:	100 Minutes Of Realness
Chapter 157:	Goin’ Fed
Chapter 158:	Squarin’ It Off
Chapter 159:	Out The Shop
Chapter 160:	Hail Mary
Chapter 161:	Same Ol’ G
Chapter 162:	Unlady Like
Chapter 163:	Mashing ‘N Millenium Mode
Chapter 164:	Southside Connection
Chapter 165:	Street Fame
Chapter 166:	Telephone Love
Chapter 167:	A Million Dollars Later
Chapter 168:	No Time For Bullshit
Chapter 169:	Still Standing
Chapter 170:	Wreckshop
Chapter 171:	Freestyle Kings
Chapter 172:	Straight Wreckin’
Chapter 173:	99 Live
Chapter 174:	D.E.A. Bootcamp
Chapter 175:	Players Ball
Chapter 176:	Robin St. 4 Life
Chapter 177:	In God We Trust
Chapter 178:	In The Zone
Chapter 179:	Mind Over Matter
Chapter 180:	3 ‘N Da Morning Pt. II
Chapter 181:	Grey In The Deck
Chapter 182:	Ridin’ Dirty
Chapter 183:	In The Do
Chapter 184:	Going Hard
Chapter 185:	Staying Down
Chapter 186:	Thug Life
Chapter 187:	Dead End Representative
Chapter 188:	Pay Like U Way
Chapter 189:	Another Day Another Dub
Chapter 190:	3-4 Action
Chapter 191:	Southsiders
Chapter 192:	High Till I Die
Chapter 193:	Something 4 Dat Trunk
Chapter 194:	Thangs Done Changed
Chapter 195:	Fear No Man
Chapter 196:	Sugar Hill
Chapter 197:	Elmtree Crawfish
Chapter 198:	Uncut Funk
Chapter 199:	Street Dreams
Chapter 200:	Ain’t No Sleepin’
Chapter 201:	Players Nite Out
Chapter 202:	Still In Da Game
Chapter 203:	Almost On Dem Streets
Chapter 204:	The Meadows
Chapter 205:	Slippin’ Red
Chapter 206:	Haters Stay Away
Chapter 207:	Goin’ All Out
Chapter 208:	Austin 2 Houston Pt. II
Chapter 209:	Deep Down South
Chapter 210:	Bangin’ Down The Strip
Chapter 211:	Off Parole
Chapter 212:	Still Hustlin’
Chapter 213:	Made Niggaz
Chapter 214:	Old School
Chapter 215:	South Side Players
Chapter 216:	Flippin’ On A Sunny Day
Chapter 217:	Sittin’ On Chrome
Chapter 218:	Way 2 Real
Chapter 219:	Leanin In The Leans
Chapter 220:	Player Memories
Chapter 221:	2 Pints Deep
Chapter 222:	My Block
Chapter 223:	Trey Day
Chapter 224:	97 Live
Chapter 225:	Back Up In You
Chapter 226:	Million Dollar Hands
Chapter 227:	We Don’t Bar It
Chapter 228:	Back On The Grind
Chapter 229:	Thugs Night Out
Chapter 230:	Paying Dues
Chapter 231:	Love 4 The Hood
Chapter 232:	Tryin 2 Survive
Chapter 233:	Finally Made It
Chapter 234:	Still A G At 23
Chapter 235:	Flippin 2 Da Classic Pt. II
Chapter 236:	Screw & Blunt
Chapter 237:	Dope Dealin & Cap Peelin
Chapter 238:	On The Real
Chapter 239:	3-D
Chapter 240:	That Classic
Chapter 241:	Hurtin These Boys
Chapter 242:	Puttin It Down
Chapter 243:	Commin Up Quick
Chapter 244:	It Don’t Stop
Chapter 245:	Waitin On Slant
Chapter 246:	Willow Glen
Chapter 247:	Sudden Death
Chapter 248:	380 D On That Ass
Chapter 249:	12/16/1972
Chapter 250:	Da Return
Chapter 251:	Stressed Out
Chapter 252:	Separatin Da Real From Da Fake 
Chapter 253:	Stayin Sucka Free
Chapter 254:	Fresh Out The County
Chapter 255:	Elimination
Chapter 256:   Screw & Doug
Chapter 257:	All About Pat
Chapter 258:	Fuck The World
Chapter 259:	Somethin' 4 U Haters
Chapter 260:	Bar It 4 What
Chapter 261:	R.I.P. Tee Lee
Chapter 262:	Clay & Screw
Chapter 263:	Nard & Screw
Chapter 264:	Screw Dub '96
Chapter 265:	Shay & Screw
Chapter 266:	Till Death Do Us PART
Chapter 267:	4 Young Gees
Chapter 268:	Dave & Screw
Chapter 269:	Lil Rob Personal
Chapter 270:	D Pac & Screw
Chapter 271:   Screw & Terrance
Chapter 272:   Screw Dub '96
Chapter 273:   So Much Pain
Chapter 274:   Still Thuggin Pt. II
Chapter 275:   Screw Dub '95
Chapter 276:   Herschelwood
Chapter 277:   Shootin Slugs
Chapter 278:   Lil Chuck & Screw
Chapter 279:   Just Another Tight Screw
Chapter 280:	5:00 AM
Chapter 281:   Stackin Paper
Chapter 282:   Sprinkle Me '97
Chapter 283:   Screw Dub '98
Chapter 284:   So Many Ways
Chapter 285:	Yellowstone Texas '95
Chapter 286:	Out On Bond '95
Chapter 287:	Floss Mode '96
Chapter 288:	Fuck You Haters
Chapter 289:	In Yo Ear
Chapter 290:   Tolu
Chapter 291:   One Year Later
Chapter 292:   Cloverland
Chapter 293:   Screw & Piccolo
Chapter 294:   Jut & Screw
Chapter 295:   Screw Dub
Chapter 296:   '96 Live
Chapter 297:   Stick 1 & Screw
Chapter 298:   Together Forever
Chapter 299:   Screw Dub 94 – 3rd Ward/Herschelwood
Chapter 300:   Hell Raiser/Screw Dub
Chapter 301:    Smoke One/Smoke Two '91
Chapter 302:    DJ Screw & Lante ’94
Chapter 303:    ESG ’94
Chapter 304:    3rd Ward Freestyle ’98/4th Ward Freestyle ’95
Chapter 305:    Dre & Screw ’95
Chapter 306:    Herschelwood Click ’94
Chapter 307:    BC & Screw ’97
Chapter 308:    Mantny & Screw ’95
Chapter 309:    Hen Duce & Screw ’95
Chapter 310:    Big G
Chapter 311:    1 Deep/Stick 1 ’94
Chapter 312:    Poppy & Screw ’97
Chapter 313:    South Side ’94
Chapter 314:    Mann Phoo
Chapter 315:    Live From Club Nouveau ’97
Chapter 316:    Live From Club Nouveau ’97 Pt. 2
Chapter 317:    Screw Dub ’97
Chapter 318:    Screw Dub Stick 1 ’98
Chapter 319:    Floyd & Screw ’98
Chapter 320:    On A Mission
Chapter 321:    Still Thuggin Pt. 1
Chapter 322:    Houston 2 Austin '95 Pt. 1
Chapter 323:    March Madness '98
Chapter 324:    Dusk 2 Dawn
Chapter 325:    Screw Dub 325
Chapter 326:    Red Turn Heads
Chapter 327:    ESG Live At Screw House '94
Chapter 328:    Screw Dub 328
Chapter 329:    Big Mello '92 / Botany Boys '93
Chapter 330:    Live From Club Nouveau '97 Pt. 3
Chapter 331:    Live From Club Nouveau '97 Pt. 4
Chapter 332:    Live From Club Nouveau '97 Pt. 5
Chapter 333:    Live From Club Nouveau '97 Pt. 6
Chapter 334:    Live From Club Nouveau '97 Pt. 7
Chapter 335:    Live From Club Nouveau '97 Pt. 8
Chapter 336:    Live From Club Nouveau '97 Pt. 9
Chapter 337:    Gettin On Bout Mine '95
Chapter 338:    Screw Dub '94 338
Chapter 339:    G Town C Side '95
Chapter 340:    4th Ward '95
Chapter 341:    Smoke On
Chapter 342:    Club New Jack' 91
Chapter 343:    What's Really Goin On '95
Chapter 344:    Stayin Down Pt.2 '95
Chapter 345:    Got It On My Mind '96
Chapter 346:    Crawlin Down On Boys
Chapter 347:    Ghetto Thugs '97/'94 Flows
Chapter 348:    Shuttin A Door '95
Chapter 349:    Funky Ride
Chapter 350:    2000
Chapter 351:    New 2000
Chapter 352:    2000 Freestyle

Appearances

 E.S.G. – Ocean Of Funk (1994)
 Aggravated – Accept (1995)
 Al-D – Home Of The Free (1995)
 E.S.G. – Sailin' Da South (1995)
 Al-D – Mind At Ease (1996)
 Mr. 3-2 – The Wicked Buddah Baby (1996)
 Point Blank – N Tha Doe (1997)
 5th Ward Soundtrack (1997)
 Botany Boyz – Thought of Many Ways (1997)
 DJ DMD – Eleven (1997)
 Lil Keke – Don't Mess With Texas (1997)
 SPM (South Park Mexican) – Power Moves (double disc, 1998)
 Southside Playaz – You Gottus Fuxxed Up (1998)
 Dead End Alliance – Screwed 4 Life (1998)
 Lil Keke – The Commission (1998)
 C-Note – 3rd Coast Born (1999)
 Lil O – Blood Money (1999)
 Rap-a-Lot Records – R.N.D.S. (compilation, 1999)
 Point Blank – Bad News Travels Fast (2000)
 Lil' Flip – The Leprechaun (2000)
 K-Rino – No Mercy (2000)
 Big Hawk – Under H.A.W.K.'s Wings (2000)
 Big Moe – City of Syrup (2000)
 Al-D – Unconditional Luv (2002)
 Big Floyd - Sittin On Top Of The World (1996)

References

Further reading 
  ‎

External links 
 Mtv DJ Screw Album Discography

 Screwed Up Records & Tapes – Official site (requires flash)
 Deft Magazine Commemorative Rest In Peace Mixtape – Deft Magazine
 DJ Screw: A Fast Life In Slow Motion – Red Bull Music Academy

1971 births
2000 deaths
Drug-related deaths in Texas
People from Smithville, Texas
Rappers from Houston
Screwed Up Click members
American hip hop DJs
20th-century American musicians
Southern hip hop musicians
20th-century African-American musicians